The 2003 South Sydney Rabbitohs season was the 94th in the club's history. Coached by Paul Langmack and captained by Bryan Fletcher, Owen Craigie, Paul Stringer and Jason Death, they competed in the National Rugby League's 2003 Telstra Premiership, finishing the regular season 15th out of 15 teams, failing to reach the finals.

Ladder

Fixtures

Regular season

References

South Sydney Rabbitohs seasons
South Sydney Rabbitohs season